Caló (also known as Pachuco) is an argot or slang of Mexican Spanish that originated during the first half of the 20th century in the Southwestern United States. It is the product of zoot-suit pachuco culture that developed in the 1930s and '40s in cities along the US/Mexico border.

Origin
According to Chicano artist and writer José Antonio Burciaga:

He goes on to describe the speech of his father, a native of El Paso, Texas:

The Caló of El Paso was probably influenced by the wordplay common to the speech of residents of the Tepito barrio of Mexico City. One such resident was the comic film actor Germán Valdés, a native of Mexico City who grew up in Ciudad Juárez (just across the US-Mexico border from El Paso).  His films did much to popularize the language in Mexico and the United States.

Development
Caló has evolved in every decade since the 1940-1950s. It underwent much change during the Chicano Movement of the 1960s as Chicanos began to enter US universities and become exposed to counterculture and psychedelia. Caló words and expressions became cultural symbols of the Chicano Movement during the 1960s and 1970s, when they were used frequently in literature and poetry. That language was sometimes known as Floricanto. Caló enjoyed mainstream exposure when the character "Cheech", played by Cheech Marin, used Caló in the Cheech and Chong movies of the 1970s.

By the 1970s, the term Pachuco was frequently shortened to Chuco. The Pachuco originated from El Paso, which was the root of the city's nickname, "Chuco Town". Pachucos usually dressed in zoot suits with wallet chains, round hats with feathers and were Chicanos.

Caló is not to be confused with Spanglish, which is not limited to Mexican Spanish. It is similar to Lunfardo in that it has an eclectic and multilingual vocabulary.

Features 
Caló makes heavy use of code-switching. Caló uses rhyming and, in some cases, a type of rhyming slang similar to Cockney rhyming slang or African American Vernacular English jive.

Examples
Since Caló is primarily spoken by individuals with varying formal knowledge of Spanish or English, variations occur in words, especially of phonemes pronounced similarly in Spanish: c/s, w/hu/gu, r/d, and b/v. It is common to see the word barrio ("neighborhood") spelled as varrio, vato ("dude") spelled as bato or güero ("blond/white man") spelled as huero or even weddo.

Usage
The translations should not be taken literally; they are idioms like the English "See you later alligator".

¿Qué Pasiones?  (literally "What Passions") ¿Qué Pasa? meaning "What is going on?"
¿Si ya sábanas, paquetes hilo? or Si ya Sabanas, pa' que cobijas  (literally, "If already sheets, packages thread?/covers what for") ¿Si ya sabes, pa(ra) qué te digo? meaning, "If you already know, why am I telling you?"

Occasionally, English is spoken with Mexican features. Speaking to a sibling or family member about parents, for example, a Caló speaker will refer to them as "My Mother" (Mi Mamá) instead of "Mom" or "Our mother".

Rhyming is sometimes used by itself and for emphasis.

Common phrases include: 
¿Me comprendes, Méndez?  "Do you understand, Méndez?"
¿O te explico, Federico?  "Or do I explain it to you, Federico?"
Nel, pastel  "No way" (lit. "Nay, Cake")
Al rato, vato  "Later, dude" (lit. "al rato" means "later"; "vato" means friend or guy)
¿Me esperas, a comer peras?  "Will you wait for me?" (lit. "will you wait for me to eat pears?")
¿Qué te pasa, calabaza?  "Whats going on?"  (lit. "What is happening to you, squash/pumpkin?")
Nada Nada, Limonada  "Not much" (lit. "Nothing, nothing, lemonade".  Spoken as a response to the above, "¿Qué te pasa, calabaza?").

In popular culture
 American Me
 Akwid
 Blood In Blood Out
 Cheech and Chong
 La Chilanga Banda, a song by Café Tacuba
 Culture Clash
 Don Tosti
 Edward James Olmos
 George Lopez (TV series)
 Harsh Times
 Homies
 Frost - Chicano rap artist whose song "La Raza" uses Caló
 Lalo Guerrero - Pachuco swing musician
 Lowrider Magazine
 Gilbert "Magú" Luján
 La Mission (2009 movie)
 Mi Vida Loca
 Robert Rodriguez
 Sublime
 Tin Tan - actor from the Golden Age of Mexican Cinema who popularized Pachuco dress and talk
 Zoot Suit (film)
 Zoot Suit (play)
 El Mero Perro - Chicano Rap Artist and Music Producer who uses many Caló lyrics with Tejano/Chicano Pachuco themes in his songs

See also

Chicano English
 East Los
 Órale
 Pachuco

Sources 

Aguilar Melantzón, Ricardo. Glosario del caló de Cd. Juárez. (translated by Federico Ferro Gay ; edited by María Telles-McGeagh, Patricia A. Sullivan. Las Cruces, N.M.: Joint Border Research Institute, New Mexico State University, c1989.
Burciaga, José Antonio. Drink Cultura: Chicanismo. Santa Barbara: Joshua Odell Editions, Capra Press, 1993. 
Cummings, Laura. "The Pachuco Language Variety in Tucson." In Pachucas and Pachucos in Tucson: Situated Border Lives. University of Arizona Press, 2009. pp 95–131
Fuentes, Dagoberto. Barrio language dictionary: first dictionary of Caló [by] Dagoberto Fuentes [and] José A. López. La Puente, California: El Barrio Publications, 1974.
Galindo, D. Letticia. "Dispelling the Male-Only Myth: Chicanas and Calo." Bilingual Review 16: 1. 1992.
Galindo, D. Letticia and María Dolores Gonzales, editors. Speaking Chicana : voice, power, and identity.
Hallcom, Francine, Ph.D. "An Urban Ethnography of Latino Street Gangs in Los Angeles and Ventura Counties"
Metcalf, Allan A.  "The Study of California Chicano English". International Journal of the Sociology of Language. Volume 1974, Issue 2, Pages 53–58
JL Orenstein-Galicia. "Totacho a Todo Dar: communicative functions of Chicano Caló along the US-Mexico border." La Linguistique (Paris. 1965)
Ortega, Adolfo. Caló Orbis: semiotic aspects of a Chicano language variety New York: P. Lang, c1991. 
Ortega, Adolfo. Caló tapestry. Berkeley: Editorial Justa Publications, 1977. 
Polkinhorn, Harry, Alfredo Velasco, and Malcom Lambert. El Libro De Caló: The Dictionary of Chicano Slang. Mountain View, California: Floricanto Press, 1988.   
Webb, John Terrance. A lexical study of Caló and non-standard Spanish in the Southwest. (dissertation), 1976.
Manuel Cantú - Pachuco Dictionary 

Cant languages
Spanish language in the United States
Chicano